The Rangitoto Channel is one of several passes between the islands of the inner Hauraki Gulf, close to the mouth of the Waitematā Harbour to the east of Auckland in New Zealand. The channel is an important stretch of water as it is the only deep water approach to Auckland Port for large ships such as container cargo ships and passenger cruise liners.

The channel separates the volcanic cone of Rangitoto Island from the East Coast Bays of the North Shore, to the north of the Waitemata's entrance.

The channel was last dredged from a depth of 11.2m to 12.5m in a two-stage process in 2004. The first stage involved the mechanical excavation of hard rock. Blasting was not required. This was followed by the removal of softer material. All dredged material was used in the reclamation at Fergusson wharf.

References

Hauraki Gulf
Straits of New Zealand
Landforms of the Auckland Region